General Sir Timothy John Granville-Chapman,  (born 5 January 1947) is a former British Army officer, who served as Vice-Chief of the Defence Staff of the British Armed Forces (2005–2009).

Early life
Granville-Chapman was born on 5 January 1947. He was educated at Charterhouse School, a public school in Godalming, Surrey. He studied law at Christ's College, Cambridge, and graduated from the University of Cambridge with a Bachelor of Arts (BA) in 1968; as per tradition, this was promoted to a Master of Arts (MA (Cantab)) degree.

Military career
Granville-Chapman was commissioned into the Royal Artillery in 1968. He went on to be an instructor at the Royal Military Academy Sandhurst and then took a staff job in Military Operations in the Ministry of Defence. Later he became Military Assistant to the Commander 1 (BR) Corps before being appointed commanding officer of 1st Regiment Royal Horse Artillery (1RHA) in Hohne, Germany.

He was made the Chief of the General Staff's author for the first version of the British Military Doctrine and then went on to be Assistant Director in the Defence Policy Staff at the Ministry of Defence.

He was made commander of an armoured brigade in Germany and then Director of Army Staff Duties. He became Assistant Chief of the General Staff in 1994. He became the first Commandant of the Joint Service Command and Staff College when he was appointed to that post on 28 June 1996. He was made Adjutant General in 2000, Commander-in-Chief, Land Command in 2003 and Vice-Chief of the Defence Staff in 2005.

In July 2008 he was appointed as the Master Gunner, St James's Park. He held the position until 30 April 2017.

Honours

References

|-
 

|-
 

|-
 

|-
 

 
|-

 

1947 births
Living people
British Army generals
Knights Commander of the Order of the Bath
Knights Grand Cross of the Order of the British Empire
People educated at Charterhouse School
Alumni of Christ's College, Cambridge
Royal Artillery officers
Honourable Artillery Company officers
British military writers
Fellows of King's College London